Batamay is a river in Kobyaysky District, Russia.

Course
The river is formed at the southwestern end of the Verkhoyansk Range, below the slopes of the Munni and Sorkin ranges at the confluence of rivers Oyun-Taryn from the right and Seeminde from the left. It flows roughly southwards across the Central Yakutian Lowland in a wide floodplain. Finally it flows into the Lena upstream from the Belyanka, near Batamay. The water pool code is 18030700112117400000017.

See also
List of rivers of Russia

References 

Rivers of the Sakha Republic
Verkhoyansk Range
Central Yakutian Lowland